Herbert Stachowicz (born 13 July 1948) is an Austrian former footballer. He played in four matches for the Austria national football team from 1972 to 1973.

References

External links
 

1948 births
Living people
Austrian footballers
Austria international footballers
Place of birth missing (living people)
Association footballers not categorized by position

1. Simmeringer SC players